Mahsnan (also Romanized as Māhsnān; also known as Māsnān, Māsenān, Māsinu, and Māsīnū) is a village in Qohestan Rural District, Qohestan District, Darmian County, South Khorasan Province, Iran. At the 2006 census, its population was 151, in 44 families.

References 

Populated places in Darmian County